The following is a list of community and recreation centres in the city of Toronto, Ontario, Canada. The city operates 152 recreation centres across the city. As part of the Toronto 2015 Pan American and Parapan American Games, the Etobicoke Olympium and the Toronto Track and Field Centre will be closed, renovated, and will reopen on September 2, 2014.

A

 Adam Beck Community Centre
 Agincourt Recreation Centre
 Albion Pool and Health Club
 Amesbury Community Centre
 Ancaster Community Centre
 Angela James Arena Tennis
 Annette Community Recreation Centre
 Antibes Community Centre
 Armour Heights Community Centre

B

 Balmy Beach Community Recreation Centre
 Banbury Community Centre
 Barbara Frum Community Centre
 Beaches Recreation Centre
 Bedford Park Community Centre
 Berner Trail Community Centre
 Birchmount Community Centre
 Birkdale Community Centre
 Bloordale Community School
 Bob Abate Community Recreation Centre
 Broadlands Community Centre
 Brown Community Centre
 Burrows Hall Community Centre

C

 Carmine Stefano Community Centre
 Cedar Ridge Creative Centre
 Cedarbrook Community Centre
 Centennial Recreation Centre - Etobicoke
 Centennial Recreation Centre - Scarborough
 Chalkfarm Community Centre
 Commander Recreation Centre
 Cummer Park Community Centre
 Curran Hall Community Centre

D

 David Appleton Community Recreation
 Dennis R. Timbrell Resource Centre
 Domenico DiLuca Community Centre
 Don Montgomery Community Centre
 Driftwood Community Centre
 Driftwood Leisure Centre

E

 Earl Bales Community Centre
 Earl Beatty Community Centre
 East York Community Centre
 East York Curling Club
 Edenbridge Seniors Centre
 Edgehill House
 Edithvale Community Centre
 Ellesmere Community Centre
 Elmbank Community Centre
 Etobicoke Olympium

F

 Fairbank Memorial Community Centre
 Fairfield Seniors' Centre
 Fairmount Park Community Centre
 Falstaff Community Centre
 Flemingdon Community Centre
 Frankland Community Centre

G

 Giovanni Caboto
 Glen Long Community Centre
 Gord And Irene Risk Community Centre
 Goulding Community Centre
 Grandravine Community Recreation Centre
 Gus Ryder Pool And Health Club

H

 Harrison Pool
 Harwood Hall
 Heron Park Community Centre
 Hillcrest Community Centre
 Hilltop Community School
 Hollycrest CS
 Holy Family Community Centre
 Horner Ave Seniors Centre
 Humberwood Community Centre

I

 Irving W Chapley Community Centre
 Islington CS
 Islington Seniors' Centre

J

 Jack Goodlad Centre
 James S. Bell CS
 Jenner Jean-Marie Community Centre
 Jimmie Simpson Recreation Centre
 John Booth Arena
 John English CS
 John G. Althouse CS
 John Innes Community Recreation Centre
 Joseph J. Piccininni Community Centre

K

 Keele Community Centre
 Keele Street Jr. School
 Ken Cox Community Centre
 Kingsview Village CS

L

 L'Amoreaux Community Recreation Centre
 Lawrence Heights Community Centre
 Leaside Curling Club
 Leaside Library

M

 Main Square Community Centre
 Malvern Recreation Centre
 Markdale Preschool Site
 Mary McCormick Recreation Centre
 Masaryk-Cowan Community Centre
 Matty Eckler Recreation Centre
 Maurice Cody Community Centre
 McGregor Park Community Centre
 Memorial Pool And Health Club
 Milliken Park Community Recreation
 Mitchell Field Community Centre
 Mount Dennis Community Hall

N

 New Toronto Seniors Centre
 Norseman Community School And Pool
 North Kipling Community Centre
 North Toronto Memorial Community
 North York Civic Centre
 Northwood Community Centre

O

 Oakdale Community Centre
 Oakridge Community Recreation Centre
 O'Connor Community Centre
 Oriole Community Centre
 Ourland Community Centre

P

 Park Lawn CS
 Parkdale Community Recreation Centre
 Pelmo Park Community Centre
 Pleasantview Community Centre
 Port Union Community Recreation Centre
 Power House Recreation Centre

R

 Regent Park Aquatic Centre
 Regent Park North Recreation Centre
 Regent Park South Community Centre
 Roding Community Centre
 Roywood Park RC

S

 S. H. Armstrong Community Centre
 Scadding Court Community Centre
 Scarborough Village Recreation Centre
 Secord Community Centre
 Seneca Village Community Centre
 Sir Adam Beck JS
 Smithfield CS
 St. Lawrence Community Recreation Centre
 St. Marcellus CSS
 Stan Wadlow Clubhouse
 Stephen Leacock Community Centre
 Stephen Leacock Seniors Community Centre
 Swansea Community Recreation Centre

T

 Tall Pines Community Centre
 Tam Heather Curling And Tennis Club
 Terry Fox Recreation Centre
 The Elms Community School
 Thistletown Community Centre
 Thistletown Seniors' Centre
 Toronto Track and Field Centre
 Trace Manes Park Community Centre
 Trinity Community Recreation Centre

V

 Viewmount Community Centre

W

 Wallace-Emerson Community Centre
 Warden Hilltop Community Centre
 Wellesley Community Centre
 West Acres Seniors Centre
 West Rouge Community Centre
 West Scarborough Neighbourhood Centre
 Willowdale Lawn Bowling Green

See also
 Toronto Economic Development and Culture Division
 List of Toronto parks

References

External links 
Toronto Parks & Recreation website

Recreation centres